or  was a Japanese samurai and military commander during the Sengoku period.
He served Oda Nobunaga as one of his trusted generals, was severely wounded in the 1571 first siege of Nagashima, but then fought in the 1575 Battle of Nagashino and 1577 Battle of Tedorigawa.

Early life

Katsuie was born in the village of Kamiyashiro (present-day Meitō-ku, Nagoya), a branch of the Shiba clan (who descended from the Ashikaga clan, and were the former suzerains of the Oda clan).

Katsuie was the retainer of Oda Nobuyuki. In 1554, Katsuie took part in the Battle of Kiyosu Castle against Oda Nobutomo, uncle of Nobunaga.

In 1556, when control of the Oda clan was contested, Katsuie initially supported his lord, Nobuyuki, against his elder brother Oda Nobunaga. 
Katsuie launched a coup d'état against Nobunaga. He was defeated at the Battle of Inō, and in the aftermath Nobunaga had his brother executed, but impressed with the retainer's loyalty and bravery, spared the life of Katsuie. Katsuie pledged his services to Nobunaga, earning his praises.

Military life

In 1560, he was commander of Nobunaga's main forces against Imagawa Yoshimoto at the Battle of Okehazama.

In 1567, he led the first division of Oda Nobunaga's forces, in the siege of Inabayama against Saito clan.

In late 1568, Katsuie, along with Hosokawa Fujitaka, Hachiya Yoritaka, Mori Yoshinari and Sakai Masahisa attacked Iwanari Tomomichi at Shōryūji Castle.

In 1570, while the Oda–Tokugawa coalition fought at the Battle of Anegawa against the Asakura and Azai clans, Katsuie was at Chōkō-ji castle, under siege by 4,000 soldiers of the Rokkaku clan. Katsuie eventually won via an all-out attack, forcing the Rokkaku to retreat.  This action, along with a series of brilliant victories, gained him renown as the "Oni Shibata", or "Demon Shibata".

In 1571, he fought in the first Siege of Nagashima and was severely wounded.

In 1573, when Shogun Ashikaga Yoshiaki, who was protected by the Mori clan, built an anti-Nobunaga network, Katsuie fought against Yoshiaki's forces in various places including Omi Province and Settsu Province as a powerful military commander of the Oda army. Later, He took part in the Siege of Ichijodani Castle and also in the Second Siege of Nagashima right after that, but he pulled back again.

In 1574, he took part in the third Siege of Nagashima. He commanded the right wing among the three groups along with Sakuma Nobumori.

In 1575, he fought in the Battle of Nagashino against Takeda Katsuyori.

In 1576, after gaining control of Echizen, he took command of Kitanosho Castle (Hokujō) and was ordered to conquer the Hokuriku region.

In 1577, Nobunaga sent an army led by Shibata Katsuie and some of his most experienced generals to reinforce Shigetsura from Noto province against Uesugi Kenshin at the Battle of Tedorigawa.

In 1580, he led an army, which included his general Sakuma Morimasa in a fight against the Kaga Ikko-ikki at Kanazawa Gobo.

In 1581, after controlling Noto, he began a campaign against Etchū Province along with Maeda Toshiie, Sassa Narimasa and Fuwa Mitsuharu.

In 1582, he and Sassa Narimasa successfully laid siege to Uozu and Matsukura Castle. 
In the meantime, Nobunaga was betrayed and killed at Honnō-ji by Akechi Mitsuhide.

Death
Later in 1582, after the death of Nobunaga, in a meeting at Kiyosu Castle to determine Nobunaga's successor, Katsuie initially supported the choice of Samboshi, Nobunaga's grandson. but he later supported Oda Nobutaka, Nobunaga's third son, for whom Katsuie had performed the genpuku ritual. He then allied with Oda Nobutaka and Takigawa Kazumasu against Toyotomi Hideyoshi who was allied with Oda Nobukatsu. Tension quickly escalated between Hideyoshi and Katsuie, and the following year they clashed at the Battle of Shizugatake.

Battle of Shizugatake

In 1583, Katsuie sent his nephew Sakuma Morimasa to besiege Takayama Ukon and Nakagawa Kiyohide at Shizugatake. Morimasa ignored Shibata's orders to withdraw to Ōiwa and was captured and beheaded by Toyotomi Hideyoshi's returning forces. 
Katsuie was defeated and retreated back into Echizen, all the way to Kitanosho Castle, which was taken in 3 days.

During the siege, Katsuie implored his wife, Oichi, to take their daughters and leave, but she decided to stay and die with him, while letting their daughters escape. After setting fire to his castle, Katsuie committed seppuku.

His death poem was:

Natsu no yo no
yumeji hakanaki
ato no na o
kumoi ni ageyo
yamahototogisu

"Fleeting dream paths, in the summer night! O bird of the mountain, carry my name beyond the clouds."

Family
 Wife: Oichi (1547-1583)
 Step-daughters:
 Yodo-dono (1569-1615)
 Ohatsu (1570-1633)
 Oeyo (1573-1626)
 Adopted sons:
 Shibata Katsutoyo
 Shibata Katsumasa

In popular culture
Shibata Katsuie is a playable character in Koei Tecmo's Samurai Warriors 2: Empires and all subsequent Samurai Warriors, the Warriors Orochi games, and Sengoku Basara 4. He appears in Nioh 2 and Fate/Grand Order as a side character.

See also

 
 The Kiyosu Conference (2013 film)

References

http://www.samurai-archives.com/katsuie.html

External links

Shibata family history on Harimaya.com
Shibata genealogy

1522 births
1583 deaths
Daimyo
Suicides by seppuku
Oda retainers
People of Muromachi-period Japan
People of Azuchi–Momoyama-period Japan
Military engineers
Deified Japanese people
16th-century suicides